Senator Kelsey may refer to:

Charles S. Kelsey (1822–1901), Wisconsin State Senate
Dick Kelsey (politician) (born 1946), Kansas State Senate
Edwin B. Kelsey (1826–1861), Wisconsin State Senate